The 1995 FIBA Americas Championship for Women, was the third FIBA Americas Championship for Women regional basketball championship held by FIBA Americas, which also served as Americas qualifier for the 1996 Summer Olympics, granting berths to the champion and runner-up. It was held in Canada between June 22 and June 29, 1995. Five national teams entered the event under the auspices of FIBA Americas, the sport's regional governing body. The city of Hamilton hosted the tournament. Canada won their first title after defeating hosts Cuba in the final.

Format
The preliminary stage consisted of a single round-robin group. The top four teams advanced to the knockout semifinals, where the winners qualified directly to the 1996 Summer Olympics. The winners from the semifinals competed for the championship. There was no third place game.

First round

|}

Knockout stage

Semifinals

Final

Final standings

External links
1995 American Olympic Qualifying Tournament for Women, FIBA.com. Retrieved January 22, 2015.

FIBA Women's AmeriCup
1995 in women's basketball
1994–95 in Canadian basketball
International women's basketball competitions hosted by Canada
1994–95 in North American basketball
1994–95 in South American basketball